On March 5, 2019, Jair Bolsonaro, then president of Brazil, tweeted a video of a sexual act involving urine that took place at Carnival, suggesting that that scene was common. The next day, he published: "What is golden shower?", a term that describes the act in the video. Both posts were criticized by both supporters and critics of the president, and had international repercussions.  The term "golden shower" has seen an increase in popularity on Google and Pornhub, as well as being mentioned on TV shows. Some commented that the post could harm Carnival's image.

The Palácio do Planalto and Bolsonaro himself later commented on the controversy. The duo that appears in the original video declared that the act was "political-artistic" and, days later, filed a complaint against the president at the Supreme Federal Court (STF) demanding that he delete the posts, which was done. Retrospectively, the phrase has been included in lists of controversial and striking facts about the Bolsonaro government and has been analyzed as an example of his "phallic obsession" and his "foolish verbiage".

References

2019 controversies
2019 in Brazilian politics
Twitter controversies
Jair Bolsonaro